The Committee of Emergency Situations and Civil Defense of Tajikistan (KHF) is the emergencies and civil defense ministry of Tajikistan. The ministry is authorized to make decisions on the protection of the Tajik population/territory from natural disasters and other geological processes.

Names
Anti-Domestic Defense Force (1918–1961)
Civil Defense of the Tajik SSR (1961–1992)
Committee of Civil Defense of the Ministry of Defense (1992–1999)
Ministry of Emergency Situations and Civil Defense (1999–2000)
Committee of Emergency Situations and Civil Defense of Tajikistan (2000–Present)

Structure
KHF Headquarters 
Office of the Chairman
General Directorate 
Main Department of Population and Territory Protection
Personnel Office
Department of Management of construction, Operation of Buildings and Structures
Personnel Department
International Cooperation Office
Financial and Economic Management Department
Medical Management Department
Crisis Management Center
Legal Department
Public Relations Department
Operational Section
Central Apparatus
Office of Specialized Search and Rescue Services
Office of Logistics, Food and Transport
Sarez Lake Department
KHF Office in the Autonomous Regions
Department of Emergency and Civil Defense Committee for Kulob and the Khatlon Region
Department of the District Departments
Rapid Response Rescue squads
Anti-Hail Service
Civil Defense Troops
Republican organizations 
Republican Training Center
Republican Chemical Radiometric Laboratory
Military Hospital
Republican Militarized Mountain Rescue Service

List of chairmen
Since 1994, the KHF has had 7 chairmen:

H. Achilov (1994–1996)
A. Boboev (1996–1998)
M. Iskandarov (1998–1999)
M. Ziyoev (1999–2006)
M. Zokirov (2006–2008)
H. Latipov (2008–2012)
Khayriddina Abdurahimov (2012–February 2, 2016)
Rustam Nazarzoda (February 2, 2016–Present)

Cooperation with regional partners
The KHF had made many agreements with its regional neighbors such as the Russian Federation and China, which date back to the country's establishment in 1991. Similar agreements on a much smaller scale have been established between countries such as Kyrgyzstan, Switzerland and Ukraine. The committee closely cooperates with the international organizations on humanitarian affairs such as the United Nations and its subordinate bodies (UNICEF, the Red Cross and United Nations Office for the Coordination of Humanitarian Affairs).

References

Government of Tajikistan
Government ministries of Tajikistan
Military of Tajikistan
2000 establishments in Tajikistan
1918 establishments in Russia
1992 establishments in Tajikistan
Civil defense